Maanpuolustusopisto (MpO, "National Defence Institute") was the military junior college of the Finnish Defence Forces, located in Lappeenranta.  The school had a separate program for training officers "vocationally" such that they would graduate as Second Lieutenants (vänrikki), without going to the national military academy, Cadet School. The school was decommissioned in 2001 and repurposed as the Army Academy (Maasotakoulu) to provide training for the Finnish National Defence University.

It was decommissioned in 2001, and replaced by Maasotakoulu ("Land Warfare School"), which provides the undergraduate training for all cadets, who study in Lappeenranta for a year and then go to Finnish National Defence University in Helsinki. The last cohorts from the school were quickly promoted to luutnantti, and existing graduates may complete their degree by studying while working.

History
The origin of the school was in the non-commissioned officers school (Kanta-aliupseerikoulu) of the Finnish Army. In 1974, however, professional NCOs (kanta-aliupseeris) were promoted to officers called toimiupseeri (toimi refers to a specialist post) and the school became Päällystöopisto "Command School". Graduates would be promoted to vääpeli (cf. Staff Sergeant), a NCO rank. In 1993, accordance with the general restructuring of the educational system, where similar postsecondary-level schools were recategorized as tertiary, the school was also reinvented as Maanpuolustusopisto. Training would take 2.5 years and graduates were to be promoted directly to vänrikki, an officer rank.

The rank of the students was opistoupseerioppilas, which was comparable to ylikersantti, and they would be promoted to vänrikki on graduation. They could be promoted up to yliluutnantti (Senior Lieutenant, company vice-commander) and in later years, to kapteeni (Captain, company commander). Their practical tasks would be mainly training conscripts.

Defunct military academies
Military of Finland
Schools in Finland
Lappeenranta
Military academies of Finland
Education in South Karelia